A wayside cross is a cross by a footpath, track or road, at an intersection, along the edge of a field or in a forest. It can be made of wood, stone or metal. Stone crosses may also be conciliation crosses. Often they serve as waymarks for walkers and pilgrims or designate dangerous places.

History 
Wayside crosses spread mainly in the 17th century in Italy.  Most of them were erected in previous centuries by the local population as a sign of their faith. Several of them were put up at places where an accident or a crime took place. The custom of placing an "accident cross" at spots on the roadside where people have been killed has, meanwhile, spread worldwide. Special forms of cross are the conciliation cross and the plague cross. Many wayside crosses, however, simply act as waymarks to indicate difficult or dangerous spots or to mark intersections. On walking maps, wayside crosses and shrines are displayed in order to aid orientation. On many crosses there is an inscription which may indicate why the cross was erected and by whom.

In some regions wayside crosses are mostly made of wood (e. g. in the Alps). They vary in size from small, inconspicuous crosses to great crosses hewn from stout beams. On many crosses, a skillfully carved figure of Jesus Christ is displayed. In many cases, when a wooden cross became rotten or dilapidated over the decades, it was restored or replaced with a new one on the same spot.

In many regions of Europe, wayside crosses are made of stone, and consequently last much longer. That said, many such stone crosses in the Rhineland region of Germany were lost during French occupation (1794–1814), because wayside crosses were banned in the wake of the strict secularisation that was imposed. Only a few crosses were able to be hidden by the local population and thus avoid destruction. Originally these stone crosses were short and stocky in shape and, with a height of about half a metre, considerably smaller than their wooden counterparts. In the 19th century (at least in the Rhineland) much larger stone crosses were put up.

By the North Loop of the Nürburgring racing circuit in Germany there was a centuries-old stone cross called the Schwedenkreuz ("Swedish Cross").

In 1594, the fortress city of Raab (present day Győr in Hungary) was recaptured from Ottoman Empire by Baron Adolf von Schwarzenberg. In commemoration, the Holy Roman Emperor Rudolf II decreed that crucifixes be set up on all the main roads and crossing points of the empire, bearing the inscription: "Praise and thanks to the Lord God". Some of those that survive in Austria and Germany are known as Raaberkreuze ("Raab cross") or Türkenkreuz ("Turk's cross").

In Münsterland in north Germany, crosses called Hofkreuze ("farmyard crosses") may be found. They belong to farms and usually stand by a public right of way near the farm entrance. Votive crosses are erected by people in gratitude for being rescued from death, such as war, sickness, infection or other life-threatening danger. Other so-called "weather crosses" or "hail crosses" were set up to ward off natural disasters or extreme weather.

Gallery

Ancient crosses

Crucifixes

Crosses

See also 
 Buttercross
 List of tallest crosses in the world
 Summit cross
 Wayside shrine

References

Literature 

 Ruth Hacker-de Graaff: Wegekreuze im Bonner Raum. Bouvier, Bonn 1991,  (also: Bonn, Univ., Diss., 1989/90).
 Andrea Löwer: Kreuze am Straßenrand – Moderne Erinnerungsriten für Verkehrstote, in: Der Tod. Zur Geschichte des Umgangs mit Sterben und Trauer. Ausstellungskatalog des Hessischen Landesmuseums Darmstadt, Volkskundliche Abteilung, ed. by Walter Stolle (Darmstadt 2001) , pp. 166–171.
 Georg Jakob Meyer, Klaus Freckmann: Wegekreuze und Bildstöcke in der Eifel, an der Mosel und im Hunsrück. In: Rheinisch-westfälische Zeitschrift für Volkskunde. Vol. XXIII, 1977, pp. 226–278.
 Sigrid Metken (ed.): Die letzte Reise. Sterben, Tod und Trauersitten in Oberbayern. Hugendubel, München 1984, .
 Paul Werner: Flurdenkmale. Pannonia-Verlag, Freilassing 1982,  (Kleine Pannonia-Reihe 107).

External links 

 Vom Mordkreuz zum Unfallkreuz
 Sühnekreuz.de

Crosses by function